Vasile Sorin Rus (born 21 October 1983, Feldru (Bistrița-Năsăud), Romania) is a retired Romanian rugby union footballer. He played as number eight.

He was formed as a player at the U Cluj rugby club. He won the Romanian Rugby Cup once while at U Cluj and was twice runner-up with CSA Steaua București. He was also runner-up with CSA Steaua București in the Romanian Rugby Championship and won the title of player of the year of 2009 in Romania. He is currently playing for RC Timişoara in the Romanian Rugby Championship.

He has 13 caps for Romania, since his first game at the 12–22 loss to Russia, in Bucharest, at 4 November 2007, for the Six Nations B,  with 1 try scored, 5 points on aggregate. He missed the 2011 Rugby World Cup.

References

External links

 Vasile Rus at Timișoara Saracens website

1983 births
Living people
Romanian rugby union players
Rugby union number eights
Romania international rugby union players
CSA Steaua București (rugby union) players
SCM Rugby Timișoara players
People from Bistrița-Năsăud County